The following are the association football events of the year 1983 throughout the world.

Events 
May 11 – Scottish club Aberdeen win the European Cup Winners' Cup by beating Real Madrid 2–1 in the Ullevi Stadium, Gothenburg.
May 14 – Dutch club Twente is relegated to the second division (Eerste Divisie) after Helmond Sport earns a point at HFC Haarlem (1–1).
May 25 – German club Hamburger SV defeats Italian champions Juventus 1–0 at the Olympic Stadium in Athens to win the European Cup.
July 29 – Copa Libertadores 1983 won by Grêmio after defeating Peñarol on an aggregate score of 3–2.
September 14 – Dutch club Groningen makes its European debut with a defeat (2–1) against Spain's Atlético Madrid in the first round of the UEFA Cup. On the same night, NEC makes its European club football debut with a 1–1 draw with Brann in the first round (first leg) of the Cup Winners' Cup.
December 11 – Brazilian club Grêmio wins the Intercontinental Cup in Tokyo by defeating West Germany's Hamburger SV 2–1 in extra-time. The winning goal is scored by Renato Gaúcho.

Winners club national championship

Asia
  – Al-Arabi

Europe
  – Lyngby
  – Liverpool
  – Nantes
  – AS Roma
 
 Eredivisie – Ajax
 Eerste Divisie – DS '79
  – Benfica
  – Dundee United
  – Athletic Bilbao
  – Fenerbahçe
  – Hamburger SV
  – Partizan

North America
  – Puebla
  / :
 Tulsa Roughnecks (NASL)

South America
 
Metropolitano – Independiente
Nacional – Estudiantes La Plata
  Bolivia – Bolívar
  – Flamengo
  – América de Cali
  Paraguay – Olimpia Asunción

International tournaments 
1983 British Home Championship (February 23 – June 1, 1983)

 Pan American Games in Caracas, Venezuela (August 15 – August 27, 1983)
 
 
 
 Copa América (August 10 – November 4, 1983)
 
 
  and

National teams



Births 

 January 1
 Calum Davenport, English footballer
 Daniel Jarque, Spanish footballer (d. 2009)
 January 15 – Jermaine Pennant, English youth international
 January 21
Victor, Brazilian international
Ranko Despotović, Serbian international
Billy Mwanza, Zambian international
Moritz Volz, German footballer 
 January 29 – Biagio Pagano, Italian footballer
 February 11 – Rafael van der Vaart, Dutch international footballer
 February 18 – Jermaine Jenas, English international footballer
 April 1 – Mamoudou Sy, French basketball player
 May 2 – Mónica Vergara, Mexican female footballer
 May 3 – Márton Fülöp, Hungarian international footballer (died 2015)
 May 4 – Rubén Olivera, Uruguayan international footballer 
 May 20 – Sinecio León, Paraguayan footballer
 June 7  – Tshiabola Mapanya, retired Congolese footballer
 July 6 – María de Jesús Castillo, Mexican female footballer
 July 7 – Jakub Wawrzyniak, Polish footballer
 July 18 – Carlos Diogo, Uruguayan footballer
 July 24 – Daniele De Rossi, Italian international footballer
 July 25 – Pedro Zabála, Bolivian international footballer
 August 6 – Robin van Persie, Dutch international footballer
 September 28 – Richard Henyekane, South African international footballer (died 2015)
 October 8 – Michael Fraser, Scottish club goalkeeper
 October 20 – Luis Saritama, Ecuadorian footballer
 November 11 – Philipp Lahm, German international footballer
 November 14 – Kevon Carter, Trinidadian international footballer (died 2014)
 November 16 – Ron Koperli, Israeli football manager
 December 8 – Valéry Mézague, Cameroonian international footballer (died 2014)
 December 10
Lewis Buxton, English club footballer
Habib Mohamed, Ghanaian international footballer

Deaths

January 
 January 20 – Garrincha, Brazilian striker, winner of the 1958 and 1962 FIFA World Cups. Regarded by many as the best dribbler in football history.(49)
 January 28 – Claude Papi, French footballer (33)

March 
 March 24 – Manuel Fleitas Solich, Paraguayan footballer and manager (83)

June 
 June 26 – Luis Alamos, Chilean football manager (59)

July 
 July 5 – Hennes Weisweiler, German footballer and manager (63)
 July 29 – Manuel Ferreira, Argentine striker, runner up of the 1930 FIFA World Cup and player of the tournament of the 1929 South American Championship. (77)

September 
 September 9 – Luis Monti, Argentine/Italian striker, winner of the 1934 FIFA World Cup. Monti has the distinction of having played in two FIFA World Cup final matches with two different national teams. (82)
 September 20 - Andy Beattie, Scottish international footballer and manager (born 1913)

October 
 October 4 – Juan López Fontana, Uruguayan manager, winner of the 1950 FIFA World Cup. (75)

References

External links
  Rec.Sport.Soccer Statistics Foundation
  VoetbalStats

 
Association football by year